Darko Velkovski (born 21 June 1995) is a Macedonian footballer who plays for Saudi club Al-Ettifaq as a centre-back or as a central midfielder.

International career
He made his senior debut for North Macedonia in a June 2014 friendly match against China and as of then, he has earned a total of 41 caps, scoring 3 goals.

International goals
As of match played 11 October 2021. North Macedonia score listed first, score column indicates score after each Velkovski goal.

Honours

Club
Rabotnički
Macedonian First League 
Winner: 2013–14
Macedonian Football Cup
Winner: 2013–14, 2014–15

Vardar
Macedonian First League
Winner: 2015–16, 2016–17

Rijeka
Croatian Football Cup
Winner: 2018–19, 2019–20

References

External links
Profile at Macedonian Football 
 
 

1995 births
Living people
Footballers from Skopje
Association football central defenders
Macedonian footballers
North Macedonia youth international footballers
North Macedonia under-21 international footballers
North Macedonia international footballers
FK Rabotnički players
FK Vardar players
HNK Rijeka players
Ettifaq FC players
Macedonian First Football League players
Croatian Football League players
Saudi Professional League players
UEFA Euro 2020 players
Macedonian expatriate footballers
Expatriate footballers in Croatia
Macedonian expatriate sportspeople in Croatia
Expatriate footballers in Saudi Arabia
Macedonian expatriate sportspeople in Saudi Arabia